Expedition to the Hairier Peaks is the fourth album by the noise rock band Mindflayer.

The album's title is a play on words to a Dungeons & Dragons module book Expedition to the Barrier Peaks.

Track listing
"Rally for a Wind War: Whirlwind Dervish/Cracking the Barrier Riffs" – 10:56
"Getting our Hair Done" – 1:04
"Netherworld Bike Patrol C.H.A.O.S." – 6:58
"Time Tunnel/Cosmic Crypt Chronoscape Collision Course" – 6:31
"Each to their own Dark Path" – 12:33
"Mind Mirror Maze/Grow Horns" – 7:39
"Let's Play Holy War Fuckers" – 5:59
"Gore Gone Wild" – 5:02
"Nasty Meeting at Peak Park/Exploding Remains" – 14:07
"Caverns of the Hairiest Peak" – 8:05

References

2006 albums
Mindflayer (band) albums